Hagit Moshe (born 14 April 1971) is an Israeli politician, currently serving as a deputy mayor of Jerusalem and as chairperson of The Jewish Home.

Personal life

Hagit Moshe is the daughter of Tunisian Jewish parents. She grew up in Beersheba, and is the eldest of six siblings. She attended Makif B High School in Beersheba and served a full military service in the Communications and ICT Corps. Moshe received a certificate of excellence from the Southern Command during the Gulf War. Moshe holds a bachelor's degree in business administration and public administration from Touro College, and a teaching certificate from the Lifshitz Seminar for Teachers.

She is married to Itzik, director of the Torah Metzion organization in Jerusalem. They have six children.

Political career
Moshe is the chairperson of The Jewish Home and the first woman to serve in this capacity. She currently serves as a Deputy Mayor of Jerusalem, and holds the Education portfolio and the Communities and Young Families portfolio in the city.

In January 2021, after the retirement of Rabbi Rafi Peretz, Moshe ran for the leadership of the Jewish Home, at the urging of Prime Minister Benjamin Netanyahu. She received 472 votes and defeated party secretary Nir Orbach.

See also 
List of Israeli politicians

References

External links 

|-

1971 births
Living people
Deputy Mayors of Jerusalem
Politicians from Beersheba
The Jewish Home leaders
Touro International University alumni
Israeli people of Tunisian-Jewish descent